Tweddle may refer to:

People:
Beth Tweddle MBE (born 1985), English gymnast
Dominic Tweddle, English archaeologist, Director General of the National Museum of the Royal Navy
Don Tweddle Jr. (born 1979), AKA "Twedds", Australian former rugby league footballer
Isabel May Tweddle (1875–1945), Australian painter
Lynn Ferguson Tweddle (born 1965), Scottish writer, actress, and story coach

Places:
Tweddle Farmstead, Registered Historic Place in the Town of Montgomery in Orange County, New York
Tweddle Place, Edmonton, residential neighbourhood in Edmonton, Alberta, Canada

See also
Tweddle v Atkinson EWHC QB J57, (1861), an English contract law case concerning the principle of privity of contract and consideration
Twaddle
Tweddell (disambiguation)
Tweeddale
Tweedle (disambiguation)
Twiddle (disambiguation)
Waddle (disambiguation)
Weddle